Ancherythroculter nigrocauda is a species of cyprinid in the genus Ancherythroculter, native to China.

References

Cyprinidae
Freshwater fish of China